Ashianeh or Ashiyaneh or Ashyaneh may refer to:
 Ashianeh-ye Olya
 Ashianeh-ye Sofla